Ruhul Quddus Talukder "Dulu" (born 07 September 1962) is a Bangladeshi politician, lawyer, former deputy minister and former Member of Parliament represented Natore-2 constituency. Now he is an Organizing Secretary of Bangladesh Nationalist Party (BNP). Dulu was born in Natore sadar upazila of Natore district. He was a regular practitioner lawyer. Along with his legal career, he was also active in politics. In 1977, he joined the politics of the BNP's student organization Chhatra Dal.

Career 
Dulu was the member of parliament (MP) for Natore-2 from 1996. He had received 58,500 votes while his nearest rival, Ahad Ali Sarker of Awami League, had received 50,455 votes. He served in the Parliament Standing Committee on Communications Ministry.

Dulu was re-elected to parliament from Natore-2 as a Bangladesh Nationalist Party candidate in 2001. He had received 109,196 votes while his nearest rival, Md. Hanif Ali Sheikh of Awami League, had received 84,498 votes.

Dulu served as Deputy Minister for Land during the Bangladesh Nationalist Party government. Dulu was elected a Member of Parliament for the first time on 15 February 1996 of the 6th Parliament Election for Natore-2 constituency as a candidate of Bangladesh Nationalist Party (BNP). He was the Member of Parliament (MP) for Natore-2 from 12 June 1996 election. He had received 58,500 votes while his nearest rival, Ahad Ali Sarker of Awami League, had received 50,455 votes. He served in the Parliamentary Standing Committee on Communications Ministry.

Dulu was re-elected to parliament from Natore-2 as a Bangladesh Nationalist Party candidate in 2001. He had received 109,196 votes while his nearest rival, Md. Hanif Ali Sheikh of Awami League, had received 84,498 votes.

The High Court on Monday cleared BNP leaders Iqbal Hasan Mahmud Tuku and Ruhul Quddus Talukder Dulu to contest the 11th parliamentary election, reports UNB...

Earlier, the EC rejected the appeals by BNP's Iqbal Hasan Mahmud Tuku from Sirajganj-2 and Ruhul Kuddus Talukdar Dulu from Natore-2 and stayed the decision of the returning officers.

Organising Secretary of BNP's central committee and former minister Advocate Ruhul Kuddus Talukder Dulu speaking as chief guest at a meeting of newly formed Pabna District Committee of BNP in its district office on Saturday.

The Bangladesh High Court cleared the way for this BNP leader Dulu to contest in the election 2018.
It directed the Bangladesh Election Commission to accept his nominations and stayed the previous rejection order of the returning officers. He is the Organising Secretary of Bangladesh Nationalist Party. He was arrested on 18 December . Joint Secretary General of Bangladesh Nationalist Party, Ruhul Kabir Rizvi, condemned his arrest and accused the government of interfering with the Bangladesh Nationalist Party participation in the general election on 30 December 2018. His bail application was rejected on 12 February 2019.

Dulu received bail on a sabotage case on 2 September 2019.

References

Bangladesh Nationalist Party politicians
Living people
8th Jatiya Sangsad members
1962 births
7th Jatiya Sangsad members